Gustavo Mancinelli (1842 in Rome – 12 April 1906, in Naples) was an Italian painter, who made portraits and depicted many Orientalist subjects.

Biography
The son and pupil of the painter Giuseppe Mancinelli, he exhibited great talent at a very young age. His first exhibition was in Naples in 1855, when he was just 13 years.

He resided in Naples where he was honorary professor of the Institute of Fine Arts.

His work includes many altarpieces; portraits of aristocratic personalities of the day, including: the King and Queen, Umberto I and Margherita di Savoia (1884), the Ambassador from Berlin, and the Prince del Montenegro. He also showed a preference for sacred and historical subject matter.

Awards and recognition
He was awarded the silver medal at the Exhibition Napoletana del 1855 and a gold medal in 1859. He exhibited in Turin in 1880: A Marrocchina, and portraits while, in 1883 at Rome, a portrait of Queen Margherita.

Work

See also
 List of Orientalist artists
 Orientalism

References

1842 births
1906 deaths
19th-century Italian painters
Italian male painters
20th-century Italian painters
Orientalist painters
Painters from Naples
19th-century Italian male artists
20th-century Italian male artists